Stay+, also known as Stay Positive or Stay Plus (and formerly known as Christian AIDS) is an electronic music act originating from Manchester. Originally loosely termed a 'collective', the act is now known to be the solo project of London-born music producer, Matt Farthing. Not much else is known, biographically, about Stay+ as an element of anonymity has maintained around the project until its most recent activity. Choosing to release only limited press shots, interviews and details about members/collaborators. One example saw a balloon artist take their place for a Radio 1 interview, another saw an interview answered entirely with YouTube found footage. Following a series of releases on the RAMP label (Flying Lotus, Falty DL), garnering notable critical acclaim from the likes of Pitchfork, 'Crashed' was released on Black Butter Records in November 2012 and proved a commercial step up for the project; receiving heavy mainstream radio play from the likes of champions like Radio 1's Annie Mac who made it her Record of the Week.

Discography
 Stay+ (2011) 7" single (as Christian AIDS)
 Fever (2011) 12" single and digital
 Dandelion (2011) 10" single and digital
 Fuck Christian AIDS (2012) digital EP
 Guardian (2012) digital single
 Arem (2012) 50" physical download, 12" vinyl, digital
 Crashed (feat. Queenie) (2012) digital single
 Shill / Cerebral Bore (2013) digital single

Name controversy
Under the previous guise of "Christian AIDS", the collective was forced to change their name after a cease and desist letter from the Christian Aid charity. Stay Positive was the name of their first release.

References

British electronic musicians